The Windsor Hotel in Garden City, Kansas, located at 421 N. Main St., was built in 1887.  It was listed on the National Register of Historic Places in 1972.

Its exterior walls are of local red brick and native limestone.

References

Hotel buildings on the National Register of Historic Places in Kansas
Renaissance Revival architecture in Kansas
Buildings and structures completed in 1887
Finney County, Kansas
Hotels in Kansas